Aziz Acharki (born 27 March 1972) is a Moroccan-born German taekwondo practitioner. He competed in the 2000 Summer Olympics.

References

1972 births
Living people
Taekwondo practitioners at the 2000 Summer Olympics
German male taekwondo practitioners
Olympic taekwondo practitioners of Germany
People from Nador